Fred Douglas Blaylock (May 25, 1919 – June 1967) was an American baseball pitcher in the Negro leagues. 

A native of Cedartown, Georgia, Blaylock served in the US Army during World War II, and played with the Homestead Grays in 1945.

References

External links
 and Seamheads 

Homestead Grays players
1919 births
1967 deaths
Baseball players from Georgia (U.S. state)
Baseball pitchers
African Americans in World War II
United States Army personnel of World War II
African-American United States Army personnel